Last Splash is the second album by American indie rock band the Breeders, released on August 30, 1993. Originally formed as a side project for Pixies bassist Kim Deal, the Breeders quickly became her primary recording outlet. Last Splash peaked at number 33 on the Billboard 200 albums chart, and by June 1994, the album had been certified platinum by the Recording Industry Association of America (RIAA) for shipments in excess of one million units.

The title of the album is taken from a lyric from its lead single, "Cannonball". The video for "Cannonball" was directed by Spike Jonze and Kim Gordon, and the video for the album's second single "Divine Hammer" was directed by Jonze, Gordon and Richard Kern.

A looped guitar sample of "S.O.S." was used by the English electronic music band the Prodigy in their 1996 hit single "Firestarter". A sample from "I Just Wanna Get Along" was used in another track by the Prodigy called "World's on Fire" from the Invaders Must Die album.

In 2003, Pitchfork listed the album at number 64 on their list of the Top 100 Albums of the 1990s. In 2020, Rolling Stone ranked the album number 293 in their revised list of the 500 Greatest Albums of All Time (after not including it in the original 2003 list or the 2012 revision).

On May 13, 2013, 4AD released LSXX, a deluxe 20th anniversary version of the album.

Composition
Last Splash has been seen as one of alternative rock's "most enduring masterpieces", as well as indie rock, noise pop and "effervescent" pop rock.

It is also considered "wildly", "willingly" experimental, sporting art rock textures, "pure", "twisted" pop, and Hawaiian surf music. The latter genre is seen in the "tiki bar twang" of "No Aloha" and the "gonzo" surf rock of instrumental "Flipside". "I Just Wanna Get Along" takes on "spiky" pop-punk, while cover "Drivin' on 9" pulls in acoustic and country sounds.

Legacy and accolades
Last Splash has continued to earn critical acclaim. In 2013, Pitchforks Lindsay Zoladz called it one of alt-rock's "most enduring masterpieces", while Nashville Scenes Sean L. Maloney dubbed it "one of modern rock's most enduring albums". In a retrospective review of it 20 years on, Stereogums Tom Breihan called it "a warm, homemade, deeply and consciously odd" record.

Accolades

Track listing

Original 1993 release

LSXX track listing 

There are two versions of LSXX: a 3-CD package and a 7-disc vinyl set. The CD and vinyl formats have the same track listings.

The vinyl set contains the following vinyl:
 Last Splash
 "The Stockholm Syndrome" (partially previously released as Live in Stockholm 1994)
 Demos, rare tracks & session versions
 Safari EP
 Cannonball EP
 Divine Hammer
 Head to Toe EP

The track listing below is for the 3-CD set. All songs are by Kim Deal except where noted.

Disc 1 – Last Splash
The first disc contains the original release track listing.

Personnel 

The Breeders
 Kim Deal – lead vocals, guitar, Moog, Casiotone
 Kelley Deal – guitar, Kenmore 12-stitch, lap steel, mandolin, vocals, lead vocals on "I Just Wanna Get Along"
 Jim MacPherson – drums, bass on "Roi"
 Josephine Wiggs – bass guitar, double bass, vocals, cello, drums on "Roi"
 Tanya Donelly – vocals and guitar on Safari EP tracks

Artwork
 Jason Love – photography
 Paul MoMenamin – design assistant
 Vaughan Oliver – art direction, design
 Kevin Westenberg – portraits

Additional musicians
 Carrie Bradley – violin, additional vocals

Production
 Kim Deal – producer
 Mark Freegard – production, engineering
 Sean Leonard – assistant engineering
 Daniel Presley – engineering on "Divine Hammer"
 Andy Taub – assistant engineering

Chart positions

Singles

Certifications

References

External links 
 

The Breeders albums
1993 albums
4AD albums